Baghati is a village of Abbottabad District in Khyber Pakhtunkhwa province of Pakistan. It is located at 34°8'0N 73°8'0E with an altitude of 1306 metres (4288 feet). Neighbouring settlements include Bain Gojri, Banseri and Sohlan.

References

Populated places in Abbottabad District